The Ministry for the Future is a climate fiction ("cli-fi") novel by American science fiction writer Kim Stanley Robinson published in 2020. Set in the near future, the novel follows a subsidiary body, established under the Paris Agreement, whose mission is to act as an advocate for the world's future generations of citizens as if their rights are as valid as the present generation's. While they pursue various ambitious projects, the effects of climate change are determined to be the most consequential. The plot primarily follows Mary Murphy, the head of the titular Ministry for the Future, and Frank May, an American aid worker traumatized by experiencing a deadly heat wave in India. Many chapters are devoted to other (mostly anonymous) characters' accounts of future events, as well as their ideas about ecology, economics, and other subjects.

With its emphasis on scientific accuracy and non-fiction descriptions of history and social science, the novel is classified as hard science fiction. It is also a part of the growing body of climate fiction. Robinson had previously written other climate fiction novels, such as 2312 and New York 2140. The Ministry for the Future also includes elements of utopian fiction, as it portrays society addressing a problem, and elements of horror fiction, as climate change threatens characters.

Background
At the time of the novel's publication, American science fiction author Kim Stanley Robinson was 68 years old and living in Davis, California. He had previously written 20 novels and received the Robert A. Heinlein Award and the Arthur C. Clarke Award for Imagination in Service to Society for his body of work. Prior to The Ministry for the Future, his latest novel had been Red Moon, published two years earlier. With The Ministry for the Future, Robinson was seeking to return to the climate fiction genre that he had previously written in with 2312, New York 2140, and the Science in the Capital series (Forty Signs of Rain, Fifty Degrees Below, Sixty Days and Counting). While his previous climate fiction had approached the topic from an aftermath point of view, with the new novel he sought to write with the near-future as the starting point and with existing real-world technologies, economics, and societies,  then to push the narrative further into the future. This approach is reflected in the book's dedication to Fredric Jameson, Robinson's doctoral supervisor, who wrote that "It is easier to imagine the end of the world than to imagine the end of capitalism." Whereas many science-fiction and climate fiction stories illustrate future societies as end products of a future history, Robinson was seeking to write about that bridge-time to a future when the effects of climate change are mitigated and the Holocene extinction halted.

Plot
The book follows an international organization named the Ministry for the Future in its mission to act as an advocate for the world's future generations of citizens as if their rights were as valid as the present generation's. Beginning in 2025, the organization, established as a subsidiary body under the Paris Agreement and based in Zurich, is led by protagonist Mary Murphy, a former foreign minister of Ireland and a composite character based on diplomats Mary Robinson, Christiana Figueres, and Laurence Tubiana. Climate change is established as a threat that compromises the safety and prosperity of the future. While the narrative includes chapters of nonfiction history and descriptions of events from the perspectives of other characters and objects, the plot follows Murphy as she seeks to convince central banks of the threats to currency and market stability posed by the effects of climate change. Specifically, a coordinated global round of unconventional quantitative easing through the issuance of a complementary currency, called the carbon coin, to be issued in proportion to the mass of carbon that is mitigated. The monetary concept, called carbon quantitative easing, is based on a specific real-life policy proposal, called a Global Carbon Reward, and an academic paper referred to throughout the book as the "Chen Paper".   In Antarctica, various countries cooperate in a geoengineering project to drill to the bottom of glaciers and pump meltwater up to slow basal sliding while the program incentivizes multiple other simultaneous efforts like carbon farming, sail-driven container ships for cargo and airships for personal transport.

Style and genre
The novel comprises 106 short chapters. The chapters mostly alternate between the two protagonists: Mary, as she leads the Ministry, and Frank, as he seeks to act on his frustrations from surviving an extreme heat wave. However, numerous chapters are presented from the point of view of other characters or nameless narrators. The style also shifts from chapter to chapter, from third-person narration of the two protagonists to first-person presentations of others, including object narratives of a photon and a carbon atom. Various chapters also take the form of meeting notes, an encyclopedia article, a prose poem, a Socratic seminar, and explanatory essays, among other styles of writing. Describing this presentation, Robinson stated that the standard structure of the novel did not work for the topic and story he wanted to write. He was seeking to write with an "international scope," with characters who provide explanations for how or why institutions and systems work the way they do and how they might change. His editor at Orbit Books, Tim Holman, encouraged Robinson to try an alternative approach that resulted in various modes of writing, principally unnamed characters providing eyewitness accounts but also could take the form of an essay, drama, dialogue, radio interview, riddle, etc. Robinson, in an interview with Amy Brady, editor-in-chief of the Chicago Review of Books, described his approach as heteroglossia or polyvocal, in which the form follows function.

With climate change and the Holocene extinction looming in the background, as characters variously seek to halt it or fall victim to it, the reviewer in the Pittsburgh Post-Gazette described this narrative as "a good old-fashioned monster story." It begins with an inciting incident and follows characters who interact with privileged groups unwilling to change their habits to address the monster. This type of metaphorical monster—climate change, in this case—was compared with those of "Babadook (grief), Rosemary's Baby (motherhood), Get Out (racism), and Frankenstein (humanity)."

The novel belongs in the genres of hard science fiction, climate literature, and utopian fiction. As hard science fiction, the novel emphasizes scientific accuracy with its portrayal of technology and climate science. The exploration and extrapolation of effects of humans changing the world's climate made it part of a growing body of climate fiction, while numerous reviewers classified it as utopian fiction because it portrays a society changing in ways to address its short-comings. However, nonfiction environmental writer Bill McKibben wrote in The New York Review of Books that it "is not utopian, it's anti-dystopian, realist to its core." The novel's approach was compared with Edward Bellamy's Looking Backward 2000–1887 as a future history that bridges the gap between modern times and a future utopia.

Publication and reception
The book was published by Orbit Books, a speculative fiction imprint of the Hachette Book Group. It was released as a hardcover and e-book on 6 October 2020, and was released in trade paperback in October 2021. An audiobook version, narrated by a cast that includes Jennifer Fitzgerald and  Fajer Al-Kaisi, was published by the Hachette Audio imprint and was given an Earphones Award by AudioFile for the audiobook's presentation. The cover, designed by Lauren Panepinto with photographs by Trevillion Images, was revealed on the Newsweek website on 7 April 2020, and described by Robinson as "...suggesting something like the feel of glimpsing the light at the end of the tunnel—the possibility of getting into a new open field of possibilities." 

Author Jonathan Lethem called Ministry for the Future “the best science-fiction nonfiction novel I’ve ever read”. Former president Barack Obama named it as one of his favorite books of 2020.

Critical reception

Reviewers predominantly commented on the novel's relevance with respect to the year's events, such as the 2020 Atlantic hurricane season (the most active season to date), megafires in Australia and the Western United States, and the global pandemic, with reviewer Mark Yon summarizing that in that context, this book is "the novel we need." Reviewers also commented on the book's meticulous and well-communicated research. The first chapter, which describes a heat wave that reaches a lethal wet-bulb temperature, Robinson's counterpoint to people advocating adaptation, was described by reviewers as gut-wrenching and some of Robinson's most stunning and grimmest writing. However, the reviewers for Kirkus Reviews and The Nerd Daily found the book's "information dumping" took away from the character development and narrative drive. The review in the New Zealand online newspaper The Spinoff stated, "The book is many things, but it is never boring ... indulges wild tonal shifts ... relentless, pacy, utterly absorbing story of our near future." In Francis Fukuyama's view the novel is "ludicrously unrealistic" and "Robinson posits the most optimistic possible political developments at every turn."

Awards and honors

See also
 Longtermism
 Intergenerational equity

References

2020 science fiction novels
Novels by Kim Stanley Robinson
2020 American novels
Fiction set in the 21st century
Climate change novels
Orbit Books books
Environmental fiction books
Novels set in Switzerland
Novels set in India
Novels set in the United States